Scott "Kidd" Poteet is an American pilot retired from the United States Air Force. He is a collaborator and friend of Jared Isaacman. Poteet is slated to fly on Polaris Dawn, a private space mission.

Early life 
He earned a bachelor's degree in Outdoor education at the University of New Hampshire and later attended the Air Command and Staff College.

Air Force career

Scott Poteet is a retired United States Air Force lieutenant colonel who served 20 years in a variety of roles including commanding officer of the 64th Aggressor Squadron, pilot in the USAF Thunderbirds (Position 4), test and evaluation pilot, and commercial pilot. Poteet has over 3,200 flight hours on the F-16, A-4, T-38, T-37, T-3 and Alpha Jet. He logged over 400 combat hours during Operations Northern Watch ,Southern Watch, Joint Guardian, Freedom's Sentinel, and Resolute Support.

Personal life

Poteet and his wife Kristen have two daughters and one son. He is a runner and triathlete, competing in 15 Ironman triathlons since 2000, including four Ironman World Championships in Kailua-Kona, Hawaii.

Media coverage
He appears as a mission director in the 2021 docuseries Countdown: Inspiration4 Mission to Space.

References

See also 
 Polaris program

Living people
American astronauts
Commercial astronauts
SpaceX astronauts
Inspiration4
1973 births